Brome is a village and former civil parish in the north of the English county of Suffolk. In 1961 the parish had a population of 230. The village is now in the parish of Brome and Oakley and has been combined with the village of Oakley for centuries but the civil parish was only combined in 1982.

The village church, dedicated to St Mary, is one of 38 existing round-tower churches in Suffolk. It is a Grade II* listed building with a medieval core dating from the 12th century. A moated site near the church is a scheduled monument dating from the same period.

Notable residents
The Catholic priest and martyr Henry Morse was born in the village in 1595. Morse was venerated and beatified in December 1929 and in 1970 was made one of the Forty Martyrs of England and Wales.
John Wilbye (1574-1638), the famous English madrigalist, was born in Brome. Amongst his works is the much performed madrigal: "Adew Sweet Amaryllis".

References

 
Villages in Suffolk
Former civil parishes in Suffolk
Mid Suffolk District